Soleyman Mahalleh may refer to:
 Soleyman Mahalleh, Sari
 Soleyman Mahalleh, Tonekabon